"Asrlar Sadosi" (English: "Echo of Centuries") is a festival of traditional Uzbek culture which attracts tens of thousands of local and overseas tourists every year and presents all the diversity of the national traditions and customs, handicrafts and cuisine, unique oral and non-material heritage. Asrlar Sadosi has been annually organised by The Fund Forum of Culture and Arts of Uzbekistan since 2008, in association with UNESCO since 2009.

Overview 

The Asrlar sadosi festival consists of folklore bands competitions, folk tellers (bakhshi), traditional art-concerts, shows and national dress defiles on open-air stages. The Festival also includes folk games, koupkari (Uzbek horse sport), demonstrative fights of kurash wrestlers, cock fights and performances of rope-walkers (darboz's), competition of Uzbek national cuisine among the best chefs (oshpaz) from all over the country. During the Festival an exhibition-fair of applied arts is happening, where the best masters of ceramics, embossing, embroidery, miniature, textile and woodworking, national puppet makers and other artists demonstrate their works and the creation process.

History 
Being held annually since 2008, Asrlar Sadosi takes place in different regions of Uzbekistan in historical or cultural centers as an outdoor event. The first festival was held near Shakhrisabz, the next one took place in Akkurgan and Bostanlik districts, Tashkent Region, and was organised in association with UNESCO. In 2010, Khiva was a host city of the festival which was held in the historical architectural complex Ichan-Qala. In 2011 another well known historical city of Uzbekistan, Bukhara, hosted Asrlar Sadosi. In 2012 the festival took place in Tuproq Qala ancient fortress in Ellikqala District of Karakalpakstan.

2008 

The first Asrlar Sadosi Festival of Traditional Culture took place at Kaynar Village of Kitab District near Shahrisabz city, a cultural and historical hub and the birthplace of Amir Timur (Tamerlane), and had 30,000 participants.

"The small township made up of colorful marquees has emerged on six hills in the open air where masters of applied arts, painters, designers, chefs, and other people of culture and arts from all parts of Uzbekistan presented their masterpieces. An exhibition fair of ceramics, coinage, gold-embroidery art, miniature, textile, wood engraving, and national dolls was held as a part of the festival

2009 

This year the Asrlar Sadosi Festival coincided with the 2200th anniversary of Tashkent and took place in Akkurgan and Bostanlik Districts of Tashkent Region. UNESCO has been collaborating with the Fund Forum in organising the Festival since this year. More than 15,000 people participated in the Festival in 2009.

Besides the folk part, the program offered scientific events. On the first day of Asrlar Sadosi Festival the Youth Art Palace in Tashkent hosted a scientific conference dedicated to the presentation of a new book «Civilization, States and Cultures of Central Asia» by academician Edvard Rtveladze of the Academy of Sciences of the Republic of Uzbekistan.

2010

The historic city of Khiva played host to the third “Asrlar Sadosi” which took place in a World Heritage Site, Ichan-Qala, a walled town inside the Khiva. This year, visitors interested in archaeology and history had a chance to attend a series of educational workshops, including master classed and presentations of new research projects. In 2010 the Festival had around 20,000 participants.

2011

In 2011, Asrlar Sadosi happened in the ancient city of Bukhara with over 20,000 participants. A group of archaeologists had unexpectedly stumbled across a bath complex believed to be 1,000 years old during excavations near Magoki-Attori Mosque and Toki Telpak Furushon Dome in Bukhara. On April 30, the archaeologists did a presentation on the stunning find as part of the Festival. The visitors could experience how back in the days Silk Road travelers had rest and recovered from the exhausting journey in a partially restored historical caravanserai (inn).

The Asrlar Sadosi 2011 cultural events were the roundtable "Film festivals, a phenomenon of contemporary world culture", which brought together leading representatives of national cinema, and a fashion show by Uzbek designers. Another event presented the book "Masterpieces of Architectural Epigraphy in Uzbekistan", published by the Fund Forum with contributions from Muslim clerics in Uzbekistan, heads and teachers of religious schools, the clergy of Bukhara region, madrasa students from different cities of the country and journalists. During the presentation the Chairperson of the Public Council of Mehr Nuri Foundation, Gulnara Karimova, awarded 50 grants to the most talented students of Muslim educational institutions as well as grant assistance in the form of material and technical means to 10 spiritual educational institutions of Uzbekistan.

Like in previous years, the guests had the opportunity to attend the National Dress Festival near the ancient Kukeldash Madrassah. Famous Japanese calligrapher Koichi Honda showed his art on April 30 at Nodir Divanbegi Madrasah in Bukhara as part of the Festival. Over 100,000 people visited the "Dedication to Holy Bukhara" art show to see the twenty-three exquisite works by Honda. Some of Honda's calligraphic masterpieces can be found in the British Museum in London.

2012

The fifth Asrlar Sadosi Festival of Traditional Culture was held in Ellikqala District in Karakalpakstan (northwestern Uzbekistan) near Tuproq Qala ancient fortress. Around 50,000 people attendant the Asrlar Sadosi Festival in 2012.

This year's highlight was an exhibition of Akhal-Teke horses, whose beauty, grace and skills had been charming people around the world for 5,000 years.
Scores of motley yurts, pavilions, and cafes offering national culinary delights were mounted at the foot of the Tuproq Qala citadel while young lads dressed like warriors were standing as historical guards on top of the old walls of the fortress along its perimeter.

The capital city of Karakalpakstan, Nukus, opened a studio for making traditional Karakalpaki music instruments and ran a specialised workshop. “The Aral Sea Region: the Historical, Ecological and Social Aspects of the Region’s Development” roundtable happened in the Savistsky Museum of Art.

2013
In 2013, the Festival was held on May 4–5 in the Sarmishsai Gorge (Navoi Region), which has included a broad array of events putting the spotlight on Uzbekistan's cultural and historical legacy while drawing a decent amount of international attention. It therefore makes sense to highlight figures that reflect the festival's scope. 
This year's ‘Echo of Centuries’ Festival drew a huge audience and spectatorship totaling over 100,000 people, with another 1,500 participating in the events. Twenty-two folk groups from various Uzbek regions staged performances and showcased their art, skills and costumes during the two-day cultural celebration. 
Around 80 craftsmen and women (applied art masters) from across Uzbekistan brought thousands of unique handmade items to the Festival. 
Sixteen chefs from Uzbek regions demonstrated impressive culinary skills at the National Cuisine Festival held as part of Asrlar Sadosi. The National Dress Festival presented 15 collections by designers from Samarkand, Bukhara, Tashkent, Ferghana and Andijan. The traditional uloq-kopkari horse-riding game featured over 100 horsemen. Seven pairs of gamecocks demonstrated combat prowess in cockfighting matches while fifteen pairs of rams locked horns in ram fighting rounds. A hundred wrestlers vied for victory in tournaments of kurash, a type of wrestling central to Uzbek tradition. 
Nearly 300 volunteers affiliated with ‘Kelajak Ovozi’ (Voice of the Future) Center for Youth Initiatives were involved in preparations for the festival. Two international conferences focused on the role of culture in sustainable development and architectural epigraphy in Uzbekistan. Six books on architectural epigraphy in Bukhara, Navoi, Andijan, Namangan, Khiva and Karakalpakstan were presented as part of the architectural epigraphy conference. Twenty students from 10 madrasas were awarded scholarships as part of the annual Program of Support for Spiritual Enlightenment.

References

Festivals in Uzbekistan
Entertainment events in Uzbekistan